Samuel Stillman Osgood (June 9, 1808 – 1885) was a 19th-century American portrait painter.

Biography
Osgood was born in New Haven, Connecticut, to James Osgood and Elizabeth Badger. He studied painting in Boston, Massachusetts. After his marriage to poet Frances Sargent Locke, he continued his art education at the Royal Academy in London. Upon returning to America, he settled in New York City, where he was made an associate of the National Academy of Design. In 1849, he went to California where he stayed nearly a year, prospecting for gold and painting portraits in San Francisco.

His wife died of tuberculosis in 1850. Osgood designed her memorial at Mount Auburn Cemetery in Cambridge, Massachusetts, where she was buried. Inspired by her poem "The Hand That Swept the Sounding Lyre", Osgood designed a 15-foot memorial: a white marble base topped by a bronze lyre crowned by a laurel wreath. Four of the five strings of the lyre were designed as cut (symbolizing his wife and three daughters, who were all dead by 1851). On his death, he asked his second wife to cut the fifth string.

His portrait sitters included Frances Sargent Osgood, Edgar Allan Poe, Davy Crockett, John Sutter, Henry Clay, Alice Cary, Mary Boykin Chesnut, Thomas Campbell, Mary E. Hewitt and Caroline E. S. Norton.

Gallery

References

Further reading
New-York Historical Society. Catalogue of the Gallery of Art of the New-York Historical Society. New York: Printed for the Society, 1915. googlebooks Accessed February 29, 2008
Silverman, Kenneth. Edgar A. Poe: Mournful and Never-ending Remembrance. New York: Harper Perennial, 1991.

External links

Samuel Stillman Osgood at AskArt.com

19th-century American painters
19th-century male artists
American male painters
1808 births
1885 deaths
Davy Crockett
Artists from New Haven, Connecticut
Painters from Connecticut